Drop Dead is an album by American hardcore punk band Siege released in 1984. It is the only album the band ever released. The original "album" was a self-released demo cassette with six songs recorded at Radiobeat studios in Boston and produced by Lou Giordano. There were also three songs recorded for Pushead's Cleanse the Bacteria hardcore compilation. When the album was finally given a proper (i.e., non-bootleg) release on CD by Relapse Records in 1994, the three Cleanse the Bacteria tracks were added to the original six demo tape songs.

Deep Six Records then re-released the album on 12" vinyl in 2004, with the identical track list to the Relapse reissue, being the original six songs with the same three compilation tracks added.

These nine tracks, plus four more that remained unreleased at the time, were the only things recorded by Siege until they reformed in 1991 with Seth Putnam of Anal Cunt on lead vocals and recorded a demo tape from which one song, "Cameras", was released in 2004 on the 13 Bands Who Think You're Gay compilation album. A total of four songs were recorded in this session, the final three of which did not appear until their release in 2014 as the Lost Session '91 7" on Patac Records.

However, two separate additional reissues of the original Siege material done on LP in 2006 and 2009 by the Deep Six record label contained an additional three tracks, "Two-Faced", "Trained to Kill", and "Questions Behind the Wall". These tracks are unreleased tracks from the original Drop Dead sessions from 1984. In 2015, Deep Six reissued the album on LP, CD, and cassette, including all three bonus tracks plus a new track from the original sessions, "F-Minus".

Track listings
All songs written by Siege.

Original 1984 release
 "Drop Dead" – 1:08
 "Conform" – 2:33
 "Life of Hate" – 0:28
 "Starvation" – 0:47
 "Armageddon" – 0:26
 "Grim Reaper" – 7:23

1994 Relapse re-issue, 2004 Deep Six reissue
 "Drop Dead" – 1:08
 "Conform" – 2:33
 "Life of Hate" – 0:28
 "Starvation" – 0:47
 "Armageddon" – 0:26
 "Walls" – 1:20
 "Sad but True" – 1:17
 "Cold War" – 1:36
 "Grim Reaper" – 7:23
Tracks 1–5 & 9 from the original Drop Dead demo cassette, recorded at Radiobeat in Boston, February 6, 1984.
Tracks 6–8 originally from the Cleanse the Bacteria compilation album, recorded at Radiobeat in Boston, October 26, 1984.

2006 Deep Six reissue
 "Drop Dead" – 1:08
 "Conform" – 2:33
 "Life of Hate" – 0:28
 "Starvation" – 0:47
 "Armageddon" – 0:26
 "Walls" – 1:20
 "Sad but True" – 1:17
 "Cold War" – 1:36
 "Two-Faced" – 2:41
 "Trained to Kill" – 0:33
 "Grim Reaper" – 7:23
Tracks 1–5 & 11 from the original Drop Dead demo cassette.
Tracks 6–8 originally from the Cleanse the Bacteria compilation album.
Track 9 & 10 previously unreleased from original 1984 studio session.

2009 Deep Six reissue
 "Drop Dead" – 1:08
 "Conform" – 2:33
 "Life of Hate" – 0:28
 "Starvation" – 0:47
 "Armageddon" – 0:26
 "Walls" – 1:20
 "Sad but True" – 1:17
 "Cold War" – 1:36
 "Questions Behind The Wall" – 2:50
 "Grim Reaper" – 7:23
Tracks 1–5 & 10 from the original Drop Dead demo cassette.
Tracks 6–8 originally from the Cleanse the Bacteria compilation album.
Track 9 previously unreleased from original 1984 studio session.

2015 Deep Six reissue (30th anniversary edition)
 "Drop Dead" – 1:08
 "Conform" – 2:33
 "Life of Hate" – 0:28
 "Starvation" – 0:47
 "Armageddon" – 0:26
 "Grim Reaper" – 7:23
 "Sad but True" – 1:17
 "Walls" – 1:20
 "Cold War" – 1:36
 "Two-Faced" – 2:41
 "Trained to Kill" – 0:33
 "Questions Behind the Wall" – 2:50
 "F-Minus" - 1:26
Tracks 1–6 from the original Drop Dead demo cassette.
Tracks 7-9 originally from the Cleanse the Bacteria compilation album.
Tracks 10-13 previously unreleased from original 1984 studio session.
On the LP release, tracks 1-5 and 7-13 were on the A-side, with "Grim Reaper" on the B-side.

References

External links

1984 interview by Al Quint from fanzine Suburban Punk #6

1984 albums
Deranged Records albums
Siege (band) albums
Albums produced by Lou Giordano